Yoshinagella japonica is a fungus and the type species in the genus Yoshinagella.

References 

Dothideomycetes enigmatic taxa